Juno is a village in Ga-Matlala in the Polokwane Local Municipality of the Capricorn District Municipality of the Limpopo province of South Africa. It is located a mere 1,5 km northeast of Tibane on the R567 road.

Education 
Maduma Primary School.
Mmankogaedupe Secondary School.

References 

Populated places in the Polokwane Local Municipality